This list of botanical gardens and arboretums in Kentucky is intended to include all significant botanical gardens and arboretums in the U.S. state of Kentucky

See also
List of botanical gardens and arboretums in the United States

References 

 
Arboreta in Kentucky
botanical gardens and arboretums in Kentucky